Sthitavarman ruled Kamarupa from the Varman dynasty for the period 566-590, was son of Kamarupi King Chandramukhavarman and Queen Bhogavati.

Reign
Sthitavarman, the supporter of the world, has innumerable (sources of) enjoyment. He married Nayanadevi and had successor to throne named Susthitavarman.

See also
 Balavarman
 Bhutivarman

References

Further reading
  
 
 
 
 
 
 
 
 
 
 
 
 

Varman dynasty
6th-century Indian monarchs